The 1977 Philta International was a men's tennis tournament played an outdoor clay courts in Manila, Philippines. It was the fifth edition of the tournament and was held from 14 November through 20 November 1977. The tournament was part of the Grand Prix tennis circuit and categorized as Two Star. Karl Meiler won the singles title and the $13,135 first prize money after first-seeded Manuel Orantes had to default due to a sprained ankle.

Finals

Singles
 Karl Meiler defeated  Manuel Orantes def.
 It was Meiler's 1st singles title of the year and the 4th and last of his career.

Doubles
 Chris Kachel /  John Marks defeated  Mike Cahill /  Terry Moor 4–6, 6–0, 7–6

References

External links
 ITF tournament edition details

Philippine Open
 Philippine Open
Philippine Open
Tennis in the Philippines